Bedrock is the fictional town located in  prehistory that is home to the characters of the hit  animated television series The Flintstones.

Size 
Though the first two seasons' opening credits of the original Flintstones series stated the town's population as only 2,500 people (though it did swell to 30,000 in a dream sequence in the sixth-season episode entitled "Rip Van Flintstone"), Bedrock was generally presented as a medium-sized American city, with all the amenities of such, but with a "prehistoric" twist. For instance, sauropod dinosaurs were seen being used as cranes at the town's most well-known employer, "Slate Rock and Gravel" (also known as "Rockhead and Quarry Cave Construction Company" in the series' earlier episodes).

Features 
The climate of Bedrock is somewhat undetermined, since different Flintstones episodes and media have portrayed it differently. Palm trees and cycads are common yard trees, suggesting a warm climate. However, episodes and movies set at Christmas time depicted plenty of snow. Sometimes the wilderness on Bedrock's outskirts appears to be desert-like, whereas at other times it resembles a tropical/subtropical jungle (as shown in the opening scenes of the theatrical animated movie The Man Called Flintstone).

The people of Bedrock tend to be fairly friendly, if not without having various quirks. The denizens of Bedrock have a strong sense of civic spirit and tend to participate in various charities, parades, and so forth. The city is home to a number of service organizations, the best known of which (in the context of the Flintstones television series) is the Loyal Order of Water Buffalos, which counts among its membership Fred Flintstone and Barney Rubble.

Law and government 
A police department helps protect the residents; for a period of time, Fred and Barney were members as part-time police officers.

Bedrock has also been shown as having a volunteer fire department, although the episode in which the volunteer fire department was introduced suggests the uselessness of such a service in a city of stone buildings; instead, its members use it as an excuse to create a social club. However several other episodes feature a more traditional full-time firefighting service.

Also located near Bedrock is Camp Millstone Army Base, where Fred and his best friend Barney Rubble were stationed after they were mistakenly inducted into the Army.

Bedrock's city government plays a role in The Pebbles and Bamm-Bamm Show episode "Mayor May Not", where Pebbles becomes the city's temporary student mayor for a week.

Regarding health care, Bedrock had the Bedrock Hospital, where Pebbles was born. (An article in TV Guide referred to the hospital as the "Rockapedric Hospital".)

Media 
For a town its size, Bedrock has a sizeable concentration of media. Bedrock has several radio stations (one of which has the call letters "BDRX"), television stations, and newspapers. One of Bedrock's TV stations is an affiliate of ABC (the "Abbadabba Broadcasting Company"). Later spinoffs show the people of Bedrock also enjoy cable and satellite television service.

Television programs produced in Bedrock included the cooking program The Happy Housewife Show (which, for a time, starred Wilma) and the teen dance program Shinrock. Other favorite programs of Bedrock citizens, though not produced there, include such fare as Peek-a-Boo Camera', Hum-Along-With-Herman and variety program The Ed Sulleystone Show.

One of Bedrock's newspapers is The Daily Granite, edited by Lou Granite. For a time, The Daily Granite employed Wilma Flintstone and Betty Rubble as reporters. Another newspaper is The Daily Slab (which usually ended up clobbering Fred after being "delivered" by Arnold the Newsboy).

There are also two recording companies located in Bedrock, the Keen Teen Record Company and the Flippo Record Company.

Cultural and educational institutions 
In terms of educational features, Bedrock apparently has just one high school, Bedrock High School, alma mater of Fred Flintstone, his wife Wilma, and later his daughter Pebbles.

Universities in or near Bedrock include Prinstone University. Prinstone's archrival school is Shale University; both universities are members of the Poison Ivy League.

Bedrock is also not far from Oceanrock Aquarium, home of Dripper the Sealasaurus.

Businesses 
Businesses in Bedrock include bowling alleys, pool halls (including Boulder Dan's, which Fred and Barney almost bought), health clubs, hotels, supermarkets (including Safestone's), one catering service—Cobblestone Caterers (as the owner proclaimed, "we're the only caterer in town!"), a costume store, and an amusement park.

Several department stores service Bedrock; among them include Macyrock's (where Fred once worked as a department store Santa Claus during the Christmas season) and Gimbelstone's (where Pebbles briefly worked as a teenager).

Bedrock also features the Pyrite Advertising Agency, where Pebbles works as an adult.

In the first-season episode "The Tycoon" (in which Fred switches places with his double, J.P. Gotrocks), Bedrock is introduced by a narrator as having "a butcher, a baker and a pizza pie maker."

In the episode, "The Long, Long, Long Weekend", which originally aired on January 21, 1966, Slate Rock and Gravel Company is shown as still being in business after two million years and Mr. Slate is shown as being the company's founder.  In the future, the company is being run by his descendant George Slate the Eighty Thousandth.  Though in Fred's dream sequence in "Rip Van Flintstone", it was mentioned as having been out of business for twenty years.

Entertainment 
In terms of entertainment, Bedrock features a drive-in movie theater where films such as The Monster (as seen on the marquee in the original series' opening and closing credits) and Tar Wars (produced by Gorge Lucas, as seen in the 1994 live-action movie) would play. Other features include the amphitheater the Bedrock Bowl and several nightclubs, ranging from middle-class to high-end exclusive clubs for the city's wealthy residents. The 1994 live-action movie featured the exclusive nightclub Cavern on the Green, featuring its house band, "The B.C. 52s".  At the other end of the scale, there was The Poiple Dinosaur, a dive located by the wharf that was known for attracting seedy, criminal types.

Dining 
Bedrock features plenty of dining options, including a drive-in restaurant serving brontosaurus ribs (as seen in the original series' closing credits), as well as several diners.

The two live-action films also showed Bedrock with fast-food outlets, including RocDonald's and Bronto King.

Bedrock also has a number of upscale restaurants, including the Rockadero,<ref name="droop">Droop Along Flintstone," The Flintstones, season 2</ref> Maison-LaRock and Le Chateau Rockinbleau.

 Sports 
The fourth-season episode "Big League Freddie" shows in or near Bedrock is a baseball team named the Boulder City Giants, whose home stadium is Candlestone Park. The 1981 primetime special Wind-Up Wilma also shows Bedrock has a baseball team named the Bedrock Dodgers.

Bedrock also features a professional football team, the Bedrock Brontos. Their rival team is the Rock Bay Pachyderms.

Boxing matches are also popular in Bedrock; a third-season episode features Fred and Barney trying to see a match featuring boxer Floyd Patterstone.

"Stone Age" names
The Stone Age setting allowed for gags and word plays involving rocks and minerals. For example, San Antonio becomes "Sand-and-Stony-o"; the country to the south of Bedrock's land is called "Mexirock" (Mexico). Travel to "Hollyrock", a parody of Hollywood, usually involves an "airplane" flight — the "plane", in this case, is often shown as a giant pterosaur, with the fuselage strapped to its back. Sun Valley becomes "Stone Valley" and is run by "Conrad Hailstone" (Conrad Hilton). The last names "Flintstone" and "Rubble", as well as other common Bedrock surnames such as "Shale" and "Quartz", are in line with these puns, as are the names of Bedrock's celebrities: "Cary Granite" (Cary Grant), "Stony Curtis" (Tony Curtis), "Ed Sulleyrock/Sulleystone" (Ed Sullivan), "Rock Pile/Quarry/Hudstone" (Rock Hudson), "Ann-Margrock" (Ann-Margret), "Jimmy Darrock" (James Darren), "Alvin Brickrock" (Alfred Hitchcock), "Perry Masonary/Masonite" (Perry Mason as played by Raymond Burr), "Mick Jadestone and The Rolling Boulders" (Mick Jagger and The Rolling Stones, called "Mick Jagged and the Stones" in the live-action film The Flintstones in Viva Rock Vegas''), "Eppy Brianstone" (Brian Epstein) and "The Beau Brummelstones" (The Beau Brummels). Once, while visiting one of Bedrock's houses of "Haute Couture" with Wilma, Betty even commented on the new "Jackie Kennerock (Jackie Kennedy) look". In some cases, the celebrity featured also provided the voice: "Samantha" and "Darrin" from Bewitched were voiced by Elizabeth Montgomery and Dick York. Examples from the above list include Ann-Margret, Curtis, Darren, and the Beau Brummels. Other celebrities, such as "Ed Sulleystone" and "Alvin Brickrock", were rendered by impersonators. Some of Bedrock's sports heroes include: football player "Red Granite" (Red Grange), wrestler "Bronto Crushrock" (Bronko Nagurski), golfer "Arnold Palmrock" (Arnold Palmer), boxers "Floyd Patterstone" (Floyd Patterson) and "Sonny Listone" (Sonny Liston), and baseball players "Sandy Stoneaxe" (Sandy Koufax), "Lindy McShale" (Lindy McDaniel), "Roger Marble" (Roger Maris), and "Mickey Marble" or "Mickey Mantlepiece" (Mickey Mantle). Ace reporter "Daisy Kilgranite" (Dorothy Kilgallen) was a friend of Wilma. Monster names include "Count Rockula" (Count Dracula), Rockzilla (Godzilla), Rocky Races Penelope Pitrock (Wacky Races Penelope Pitstope) and "The Frankenstone Monster" (Frankenstein's monster), and locations such as RocDonald's (McDonald's), Toy-S-aurus (Toys "R" Us), Bronto King (Burger King) and Bank of Ameroka (Bank of America)

Layout 
Not much is known of the layout of Bedrock. The street where the Flintstones and the Rubbles live has been given various names in the original series, including "Cobblestone Lane", "Cobblestone Road", "Stone Cave Road", "Greasepit Terrace", "Gravelpit Terrace", and "Rocky Way". The town is shown consistently to include areas of suburban development, as well as a well-developed downtown core, complete with multi-story skyscrapers. The city is also served by a freeway system that is shown in numerous episodes to be subject to gridlock, despite Bedrock's modest stated population. In one episode in the original series, it is depicted as even having its own subway system.

Next door to the Flintstone residence was Tombstone Manor, home to the Gruesomes, who were parodies of the Addams Family: Weirdly, Creepella, and their son, Goblin (a.k.a. Gobby), as well as a strange assortment of relatives and pets. Later spinoffs would introduce the Frankenstones, similar monster-themed neighbors of the Flintstones.

Location 
Bedrock is the county seat of fictional Cobblestone County, and stated in the first-season episode "The Tycoon" to be 200 feet below sea level; presumably, the nearby town of Red Rock was located in Cobblestone County as well. However, no further information was ever given for any of these locations, besides being set in a prehistoric version of the United States. Near Bedrock lies Granitetown, given in one episode as the one-time childhood hometown of Barney Rubble and Fred's boss, Mr. Slate.

Bedrock in one episode is shown as being a two-day drive from Rock Vegas, and in another episode, several hours' drive from Indianrockolis, which suggests that Bedrock might be located in what is today the Midwestern United States.

Travel to Hollyrock, the prehistoric entertainment capital of the country, usually involves an "airplane" flight – the "plane" in this case often shown as either a giant pterodactyl (with the passenger compartment being a hollowed-out log strapped to the pterodactyl's back) or a wooden plane with smaller pterodactyls on each wing as the "engines".

The third-season episode "The Buffalo Convention" shows Fred and Barney going to a lodge convention in Frantic City.

The season two episode "The Rock Vegas Caper" shows the Flintstones and the Rubbles, while driving to Rock Vegas, passing the Grand Canyon; being in prehistoric times, however, the "canyon" is depicted as little more than a small stream. Fred, however, notes it "might be a big thing someday."

The season one episode "The Monster From The Tar Pit" shows Mr. Sandstone of the movie studio Miracle Pictures talking to one of his directors about staging his movie in a real town. When asked where, Sandstone walks to a flat earth globe, closes his eyes, points to an area of the map that appears to be in modern-day northern Iowa or southern Minnesota and chooses Bedrock.

It has also been suggested that Bedrock is fairly close to the ocean or to the Great Lakes, as the city has a yacht club, plus the Flintstones and Rubbles have taken several trips to the beach.

The episode, "Shinrock A Go-Go", which originally aired on December 3, 1965  featured (in a dream sequence of Fred) an animated caricature of President Lyndon B. Johnson as well as the United States Capitol in a prehistoric version of Washington DC.

Real life 
Several small tourist attractions and/or camper parks have been built in honor of Bedrock.  The most famous and oldest is Bedrock City in Custer, South Dakota which opened in 1966 and closed in 2015. There is also a Bedrock City in Valle, Arizona which opened in 1972. Two Canadian Bedrock Cities, both in British Columbia, were closed and/or demolished in the late 1990s. One in Kelowna, British Columbia was closed in 1998, demolished and changed into the Landmark Grand 10 multiplex theatre and a strip mall. The second one located in Bridal Falls, British Columbia (near Chilliwack) was closed in 1994 and was changed into a dinosaur theme park called "Dinotown" which was in turn shut down on September 6, 2010; The owners are exploring options for moving the park.
Another Flintstones themed park in Canada was Calaway Park near Calgary, Alberta. It is still in operation, although the Hanna-Barbera licensing was dropped several years ago.

The reason for the closure of the two Canadian theme parks was due to licensing. Throughout the 1980s and 1990s the licensing for any intellectual properties of Hanna-Barbera changed hands numerous times before they ended up in the possession of Time Warner.

In the late 1970s plans were developed for a Flintstone Fun Park to be located in suburban Jackson, Mississippi but never got past the initial planning stage.

For the Flintstones feature film (1994) a street in Bedrock was built adjacent to Vasquez Rocks in California. It was open for a short time to visitors before being totally demolished.

In 2018 the City of Helsinki proposed adding English as the 3rd official language after Finnish and Swedish. This led to the local area of Kallio, which translates to bedrock in English to be colloquially known as the namesake of the fictional city in the Flintstones. This has been exacerbated by the cultural ambiance in the area that is home to non-conformist bohemian souls, including artists and hobos, some of which are living in conditions very similar to the ones depicted in the prehistoric animated series.

References

External links 
 Information on the Bedrock Theme Parks
 Bedrock City, Custer, South Dakota
 Webrock – The Flintstones and Hanna Barbera Page
 Dinotown Chilliwack Official Site
 Dinotown's closure and history

Fictional elements introduced in 1960
The Flintstones
Fictional populated places